Rex Lassam (13 July 1896 – 14 January 1983) was a British swimmer. He competed in two events at the 1920 Summer Olympics.

References

External links
 

1896 births
1983 deaths
British male swimmers
Olympic swimmers of Great Britain
Swimmers at the 1920 Summer Olympics
Sportspeople from Stafford